The Nissan 300C was the export version of the Nissan Cedric Y30 series, a luxury car made by the Japanese manufacturer Nissan. It was produced between 1984 and 1987 and available as a saloon and an estate.

Saloon 
Arriving in the European market at the same time as the larger estate model, the saloon was meant to target the German luxury executive cars that dominated the class in the 80s (Mercedes E-Class, BMW 5 Series). Trimmed in moquette cloth, the car featured adjustable front seats, adjustable steering wheel, power steering, air conditioning, tinted windows, a LW/MW/FM stereo/cassette player, and a 3.0L V6. The saloon featured the same independent front suspension as the estate, but had a five-link suspension system for ride quality.

Estate 
The wagon's primary differences were a five speed manual gearbox, and no air conditioning (at least for UK market.) The estate had steel wheels and rear drum brakes instead of the saloon's discs, and had one less exhaust silencer. Altogether a less luxurious but more rugged car. There is a flip-up rear-facing seat in the cargo area technically making the 300C wagon a seven seater.

Engine 

The VG series engine was Nissan's first mass-produced V6.  It found its way into dozens of different Nissan vehicles, of which the 300C was among the first models. The VG design was used alongside the VQ series engine starting in 1994, and in 2004 the VG was retired, and the VQ was used solely.

References 

300C
Luxury vehicles
Cars introduced in 1984
Cars discontinued in 1987